Dustin Blake Pead (born January 31, 1972) is an American lawyer, judge, and college professor who serves as a United States magistrate judge for the United States District Court for the District of Utah. From 2008 to 2012, he served as an Administrative Law Judge or Immigration Judge for the Executive Office for Immigration Review (EOIR) a branch of the United States Department of Justice.

Early life and education
Pead graduated from the University of Utah with a Bachelor of Arts degree in political science in 1995 and from the University of Miami School of Law with a Juris Doctor degree in 1998.

Legal & teaching career
He served as an intern at the Immigration and Naturalization Service's field office in Miami, Florida from 1997 to 1998. From 1998 to 1999, he served as a law clerk for the Department of Justice's Immigration Court in Seattle, Washington. As an Adjunct Professor, he taught family law and estate planning at Northern Virginia Community College in Alexandria, Virginia from 2001 to 2002. From June 2001 to September 2002, he served as the Minority Immigration Counsel to the United States Senate Committee on the Judiciary. From 1999 to 2001 and from 2002 to 2003, he served as an Attorney Advisor to the Board of Immigration Appeals.

From 2003 to 2008, he served as an Assistant United States Attorney for the District of Utah.

Since 2013, he has served as an Adjunct professor teaching law skills, a political asylum, and refugee law at Brigham Young University Reuben Clark Law School in Provo, Utah.

Judicial career
From 2008 to 2012, he served as an Administrative law Judge or Immigration Judge for the Executive Office for Immigration Review (EOIR) a branch of the Department of Justice.

Since 2012, he has served as a Magistrate Judge for the United States District Court for the District of Utah.

Personal life
Dustin and his wife Tara married in 1995. Each Halloween his friends and family put on a very elaborate haunted garage with different themes and costumes.

He is best friends with Ryan.

References

1972 births
University of Utah alumni
University of Miami School of Law alumni
21st-century American judges
20th-century American educators
20th-century American lawyers
21st-century American lawyers
United States magistrate judges
Assistant United States Attorneys
Living people